"Barthood" is the ninth episode of the twenty-seventh season of the American animated television series The Simpsons, and the 583rd episode of the series overall. It aired in the United States on Fox on December 13, 2015. The episode parodies the 2014 film Boyhood.

Plot
The episode begins with Homer and a 6-year-old Bart in early 2012, lying down on the grass, as Bart asks things about nature to his father, only for Homer to ask him why he left his toy car on the stairs, resulting in a terrible fall (the reason he is lying on the grass in the first place). The family decides to take Bart to Grampa's house to spend time away from Homer. As Bart asks Grampa to play with toy cars, he remembers about an old car he had bought brand new in 1954 and had forgotten all about. Bart asks if he can sit in it, but Grampa reveals that Bart can actually drive it.

The episode fast-forwards almost 2 years into the future in late 2013, with Bart still driving Grampa's car, late for his reading class. Professor Frink tries to teach him without much success, and discovers that Lisa, who is 2 years younger, can read almost perfectly. Later, Lisa paints a boat on the sea, which Marge decides to display over the couch (it is seen in the background of the couch gags). Bart reveals that he made a painting on the entire kitchen. While Homer is painting the walls and furniture its original color, Bart tries to impress Lisa by driving Homer's car, only to crash it through the kitchen wall, almost hitting his father. Homer and Marge decide to go to a psychologist to see why their son is such a troublemaker. She says that it is because of Homer's lack of attention for him and that they should go camping together. But instead of taking the boy camping, Homer takes him to an inn to watch ice hockey, making Bart sad. Back at home, he discovers that Lisa is the student of the month at Springfield Elementary, even though she has only been there for a month, while Bart has been there for two years and has not achieved anything. Homer tries to reconcile with him by saying he loves both of them the same amount: 40%. Bart makes a bumper sticker for Homer's car, but he ignores it because there is no more room for new bumper stickers.

The episode fast-forwards to Bart's 12th birthday in 2017, where Lisa gets the news that she is student of the month at Springfield Elementary for 48 consecutive months. Bart gets angry because his sister can overshadow him - even at his own birthday party, so he decides to go skateboarding with Milhouse. They decide to break streetlamps, but Milhouse gets arrested and is taken to juvenile detention, while Bart hides at the retirement home, where Grampa gives him a BMX.

Three years later in 2020, Bart, now 15, is good at doing stunts on his bicycle. Marge and Lisa go to a camp together, leaving Homer and Bart alone. Marge mentions that this could be Homer's last chance to have a close relationship with Bart, only for them to talk a few seconds, with Homer leaving him home alone once again. Bart throws a party at their home only to find Homer high on marijuana, where he reveals that he was exactly like Bart, but when he was born, this meant he was not a child anymore. They hug each other, but their moment is ruined when Homer mentions that he will not go anywhere or do anything.

Bart goes to Grampa's grave, where he gets the idea of going to a BMX competition, where he would never be overshadowed by Lisa. At one of his stunts, however, he gets distracted by Lisa's shadow, hits the ground too hard and blacks out, only to be revived by Lisa, who is then proclaimed as a hero, making him angry. In 2024, Bart makes caricatures at the port, where he is invited to Milhouse's graduation party. He is reluctant to go because his sister is graduating the same year as them, but he decides to go anyway. At the party, Milhouse's parents fight in front of him, so Lisa tries to make him happy by saying he is "cuter than ever", resulting in Milhouse replying that she is the best thing at that party. Bart gets irate that he is always the second-best Simpson in everything, but Lisa confronts him by saying she is tired of him blaming her for every setback in his life, and that he is a good artist, even though he never does anything with his talent. Bart decides to take his sister's rage as advice.

Two years later in 2026, Bart opens a bicycle modification shop, where he is surprised by Nelson, who wants to give all the lunch money he stole at school back, giving Bart $5,000. He is also surprised to see that Lisa and Nelson are dating (again). He shows them a giant painting on a wall, showing various moments through his life. Lisa realizes that she is not on any part of the painting, so Bart lowers one of the shop's doors to show her a giant painting made in her homage to one of his favorite sisters. Nelson discovers that El Barto is actually Bart.

Back on the lawn sometime later, Homer finally answers adult Bart's questions in detail (among other things, the grass they are lying on is green because it is artificial) and finishes by advising his son to pretend to be on the phone if anyone tries to ask him for something; which he immediately puts into practice as Bart tries to ask another question during the credits.

Production
TBA

Reception
The episode received a 2.4 rating and was watched by 5.97 million viewers, making it Fox's highest rated show of the night.

Dennis Perkins of The A.V. Club gave the episode a C saying, "While this Boyhood-inspired episode of The Simpsons apes the storytelling gimmick of Richard Linklater’s coming-of-age film, it misses the point almost completely. Instead of using the time-lapse structure to lend new insight into Bart Simpson’s mind, Dan Greaney’s script just rehashes the show’s same old character beats and jokes with different haircuts. As missed opportunities go, ‘Barthood’ is especially disheartening."

Tony Sokol of Den of Geek rated the episode a 4 out of 5, saying that the episode "was well made and intelligent, poignant and funny, but it was a muted episode overall. Generally, The Simpsons use film parody as a springboard to lunacy, but sometimes they are a little too reverential. They remained faithful to the style and feel of the original and used it to forward the characterizations. But as in most Simpsons-of-the-future episodes, they contradict and will one day be contradicted. This was an inspired episode that stayed on the safe side. Wait, I have to take a call."

Screen Rant called it the best episode of the 27th season.

Dan Greaney was nominated for a Writers Guild of America Award for Outstanding Writing in Animation at the 69th Writers Guild of America Awards for his script to this episode.

References

External links
 

2015 American television episodes
The Simpsons (season 27) episodes
Older versions of cartoon characters
Child versions of cartoon characters
Coming-of-age fiction
Parody television episodes
Parodies of films